Oxfordshire is a ceremonial and non-metropolitan county in South East England. It is locally governed by Oxfordshire County Council and the lower-tier authorities of its five non-metropolitan districts: City of Oxford, Cherwell, South Oxfordshire, Vale of White Horse, and West Oxfordshire. The county is landlocked and bordered by Northamptonshire to the north-east, Warwickshire to the north-west, Buckinghamshire to the east, Berkshire to the south, Wiltshire to the south-west, and Gloucestershire to the west. The areas of Oxfordshire south of the River Thames were part of the historic county of Berkshire, including the county's highest point, the  White Horse Hill. The largest settlement in the county is Oxford, its only city, with an estimated population of 151,584.

History 

Oxfordshire was recorded as a county in the early years of the 10th century and lies between the River Thames to the south, the Cotswolds to the west, the Chilterns to the east and the Midlands to the north, with spurs running south to Henley-on-Thames and north to Banbury.

Although it had some significance as an area of valuable agricultural land in the centre of the country, it was largely ignored by the Romans and did not grow in importance until the formation of a settlement at Oxford in the 8th century. Alfred the Great was born across the Thames in Wantage, Vale of White Horse. The University of Oxford was founded in 1096, although its collegiate structure did not develop until later on. The university in the county town of Oxford (whose name came from Anglo-Saxon Oxenaford = "ford for oxen") grew in importance during the Middle Ages and early modern period. The area was part of the Cotswolds wool trade from the 13th century, generating much wealth, particularly in the western portions of the county in the Oxfordshire Cotswolds. Morris Motors was founded in Oxford in 1912, bringing heavy industry to an otherwise agricultural county. The importance of agriculture as an employer declined rapidly in the 20th century; currently under one percent of the county's population are involved due to high mechanisation. Nevertheless, Oxfordshire remains a very agricultural county by land use, with a lower population than neighbouring Berkshire and Buckinghamshire, which are both smaller.

During most of its history, the county was partitioned as fourteen divisions called hundreds, namely Bampton, Banbury, Binfield, Bloxham, Bullingdon, Chadlington, Dorchester, Ewelme, Langtree, Lewknor, Pyrton, Ploughley, Thame and Wootton.

The Oxfordshire and Buckinghamshire Light Infantry, the main army unit in the area, was based at Cowley Barracks on Bullingdon Green, Cowley.

The Vale of White Horse district and parts of the South Oxfordshire administrative district south of the River Thames were historically part of Berkshire, but, in 1974, Abingdon, Didcot, Faringdon, Wallingford and Wantage were added to the administrative county of Oxfordshire under the Local Government Act 1972. Conversely, the Caversham area of Reading, now administratively in Berkshire, was historically part of Oxfordshire, as was the parish of Stokenchurch, now administratively in Buckinghamshire. The areas of Oxford city south of the Thames, such as Grandpont, were transferred much earlier, in 1889.

Geography 

Oxfordshire includes parts of three Areas of Outstanding Natural Beauty. In the north-west lie the Cotswolds; to the south and south-east are the open chalk hills of the North Wessex Downs and the wooded hills of the Chilterns. The north of the county contains the ironstone of the Cherwell uplands. Long-distance walks within the county include the Ridgeway National Trail, Macmillan Way, Oxfordshire Way and the D’Arcy Dalton Way.

Extreme points 

 Northernmost point: , near Claydon Hay Farm, Claydon
 Southernmost point: , near Thames and Kennet Marina, Playhatch
 Westernmost point: , near Downs Farm, Westwell
 Easternmost point: , River Thames, near Lower Shiplake

Rivers and canals
From the mid-point western edge to the southeast corner of Oxfordshire, via the city in the middle, runs the Thames with its flat floodplains. This river forms the historic limit with Berkshire, remaining so on some lowest reaches. The Thames Path National Trail follows the river from upper estuary to a source. 

Many smaller rivers in the county feed into the Thames, such as the Thame, Windrush, Evenlode and Cherwell. Some of these have trails running along their valleys. The Oxford Canal links to the Midlands and follows the Cherwell from Banbury via Kidlington into the city of Oxford, where these join the navigable Thames. About 15% of the historically named Wilts & Berks Canal, in sporadic sections, has been restored to navigability, including the county-relevant 140 metres near Abingdon-on-Thames where it could, if restored, meet the Thames.

Green belt

Oxfordshire contains a green belt area that fully envelops the city of Oxford and extends for some miles to protect surrounding towns and villages from inappropriate development and urban growth. Its border in the east extends to the Buckinghamshire county boundary, while part of its southern border is shared with the North Wessex Downs AONB. It was first drawn up in the 1950s, and all of the county's districts contain some portion of the belt.

Economy 

This is a chart of trend of regional gross value added of Oxfordshire at current basic prices published by the Office for National Statistics with figures in millions of British pounds sterling.

Politics
The Oxfordshire County Council, since 2013 under no overall control, is responsible for the most strategic local government functions, including schools, county roads and social services. The county is divided into five local government districts: Oxford, Cherwell, Vale of White Horse (after the Uffington White Horse), West Oxfordshire and South Oxfordshire, which deal with such matters as town and country planning, waste collection and housing.

In the 2016 European Union referendum, Oxfordshire was the only English county as a whole to vote to remain in the European Union by a significant margin, at 57.06% (70.27% in the City of Oxford), despite Cherwell (barely) voting to leave at 50.31%.

Education

Oxfordshire has a completely comprehensive education system with 23 independent schools and 35 state secondary schools. Only eight schools do not have a sixth form; these are mostly in South Oxfordshire and Cherwell districts. Oxfordshire has a large number of leading independent schools, including public schools such as Radley College.

The county has two universities: the ancient University of Oxford and the modern Oxford Brookes University, which are both located in Oxford. In addition, Wroxton College, located in Banbury, is affiliated with Fairleigh Dickinson University of New Jersey.

Buildings

The "dreaming spires" of the University of Oxford are among the reasons for which Oxford is the sixth most visited city in the United Kingdom by international visitors. Among many notable University buildings are the Sheldonian Theatre, built 1664–68 to the design of Sir Christopher Wren, and the Radcliffe Camera, built 1737–49 to the design of James Gibbs.

Blenheim Palace, close to Woodstock, was designed and partly built by the architect John Vanbrugh for John Churchill, 1st Duke of Marlborough, after he had won the battle of Blenheim. The gardens, which can be visited, were designed by the landscape gardener "Capability" Brown, who planted the trees in the battle formation of the victorious army. Sir Winston Churchill was born in the palace in 1874. It is open to the public.

Chastleton House, on the Gloucestershire and Warwickshire borders, is a great country mansion built on property bought from Robert Catesby, who was one of the men involved in the Gunpowder Plot with Guy Fawkes. Stonor Park, another country mansion, has belonged to the recusant Stonor family for centuries.

Mapledurham House is an Elizabethan stately home in the south-east of the county, close to Reading.

The Abbey in Sutton Courtenay is a medieval courtyard house. It has been recognised by the Historic Building Council for England (now Historic England) as a building of outstanding historic and architectural interest. It is considered to be a ‘textbook’ example of the English medieval manor house and is a Grade I-listed building.

Settlements

Places of interest

See also

 Lord Lieutenant of Oxfordshire
 High Sheriff of Oxfordshire
 Oxfordshire Artweeks, an annual art festival each May
 Oxford University (including links to the individual colleges)
 Oxford Canal

Notes

References

Further reading

External links 

 Oxfordshire County Council
 Thisisoxfordshire Oxfordshire news, sport & information
 The Oxfordshire Association
 Flags of Oxfordshire
 Visit South Oxfordshire
 Banbury & District National Trust Association 
 Images of Oxfordshire  at the English Heritage Archive
 

 
South East England
Non-metropolitan counties
Counties of England established in antiquity